Reunion: The Songs of Jimmy Webb is the twenty-seventh album by American singer and guitarist Glen Campbell, released in 1974.

Track listing
All songs were written by Jimmy Webb, except where indicated.

Side 1:
 "Roll Me Easy" (Lowell George) – 2:38
 "Just This One Time" – 3:42
 "You Might as Well Smile" – 3:31
 "Wishing Now" – 3:12
 "About the Ocean" (Susan Webb) – 2:57

Side 2:
 "Ocean in His Eyes" – 3:25
 "The Moon's a Harsh Mistress" – 3:04
 "I Keep It Hid" – 3:24
 "Adoration" – 3:14
 "It's a Sin" – 2:24

Note: On the Capitol CD reissue from 2001 of this album, the 'bonus' tracks "By the Time I Get To Phoenix" and "Wichita Lineman" were added, chronologically before the original track listing of the album.

Personnel
Music
 Glen Campbell – vocals, acoustic guitar
 Jimmy Webb – piano
 Hal Blaine – drums
 Jim Gordon – drums
 Joe Osborn – bass guitar
 Dean Parks – acoustic guitar
 Buddy Emmons – steel guitar
 Larry Knechtel – keyboards

Production
 Jimmy Bowen – producer
 Jimmy Webb – arranger
 John Guess – engineer
 Sid Sharp – strings conductor
 Roy Kohara – art director
 Emerson-Loew – photography

Charts
Album – Billboard (United States)

Singles – Billboard (United States)

References

External links
 Glen Campbell official web site
 Jimmy Webb official web site

Glen Campbell albums
1974 albums
Albums arranged by Jimmy Webb
Albums produced by Jimmy Bowen
Capitol Records albums